Rossiyskii Psikhiatricheskii Zhurnal is a Russian peer-reviewed medical journal covering the fields of clinical, social, and forensic psychiatry. It was established in 1997 by the Serbsky Center with Tatyana Dmitrieva as editor-in-chief. It was included by the Higher Attestation Commission of the Ministry of Education and Science of the Russian Federation in the list of leading journals and publications and having an article published in this journal is considered to be very prestigious among Russian psychiatrists.

See also
 List of psychiatry journals
 Archives of the journal

References

External links
 

Psychiatry journals
Russian-language journals
Bimonthly journals
Publications established in 1997
Mental health in Russia
Academic journals associated with learned and professional societies